The original Ford Model A is the first car produced by the Ford Motor Company, beginning production in 1903. Ernest Pfennig, a Chicago dentist, became the first owner of a Model A on July 23, 1903; 1,750 cars were made from 1903 through 1904 during Ford's occupancy of its first facility: the Ford Mack Avenue Plant, a modest rented wood-frame building on Detroit's East Side.  The Model A was replaced by the Ford Model C during 1904 with some sales overlap.

The car came as a two-seater runabout for $800 or the $900  four-seater tonneau model with an option to add a top.  The horizontal-mounted flat-2, situated amidships of the car, produced 8 hp (6 kW).  A planetary transmission was fitted with two forward speeds and reverse, a Ford signature later seen on the Ford Model T.  The car weighed 1,240 lb (562 kg) and could reach a top speed of 28 mph (45 km/h). It had a 72-inch (1.8 m) wheelbase and sold for a base price of US$750. Options included a rear tonneau with two seats and a rear door for $100, a rubber roof for $30 or a leather roof for $50. Band brakes were used on the rear wheels. However, it was $150 more than its most direct competitor, the Oldsmobile Curved Dash, so did not sell as well.

The company had spent almost its entire $28,000 initial investment funds ($ in  dollars ) with only $223.65 left in its bank account when the first Model A was sold. The success of this car model generated a profit for the Ford Motor Company, Henry Ford's first successful business.

Although Ford advertised the Model A as the "most reliable machine in the world", it suffered from many problems common to vehicles of the era, including overheating and slipping transmission bands.  The Model A was sold only in red by the factory, though some were later repainted in other colors.

Ford Model AC
1904 Model A cars were equipped with the larger,  engine of the Model C and were sold as the Model AC. The Model AC can be visually distinguished from the Model A by its larger six-by-three-bar radiator.

See also

Cadillac Model A

References

Bibliography

Model A
Cars introduced in 1903
1900s cars
Veteran vehicles
Rear-wheel-drive vehicles
Cars powered by boxer engines
Cars powered by 2-cylinder engines